TÜBİTAK National Observatory (TUG) is a ground-based astronomical observatory operated by the TUG Institute of the Scientific and Technological Research Council of Turkey (TUBITAK).

There are five telescopes installed in Bakırtepe:
 RTT150 - Russian-Turkish 1.5-m Telescope (formerly AZT-22) (2001)
 T100 (ACE RC1.0) - 1.0 m Ritchey–Chrétien telescope (2009)
 T60 (OMI RC06) - 0.6 m Ritchey–Chrétien telescope (2008)
 YT40 (Meade LX200GPS) - 0.4 m Schmidt–Cassegrain telescope (2006)
 ROTSEIIID Robotic Optical Transient Search Experiment

Discoveries
Scientists led by a Turkish astronomer from Ankara University  discovered an exoplanet orbiting the giant star HD 208897, which is located at a distance of some 210 light years from the Earth. The exoplanet has a minimum mass of 1.4 Jupiter masses, and rotates its parent star from about 1.05 AU away in every 353 days on a nearly circular orbit. The discovery is the result of a ten-year-long research work of precise radial-velocity method carried out by using the Coude Echelle Spectrograph (CES) installed on the 1.5-meter Russian-Turkish Telescope (RTT150). Follow-up observations at the Okayama Astrophysical Observatory (OAO) in Japan and the Ankara University Kreiken Observatory (AUKR) confirmed the discovery, which was made public on August 6, 2017.

References

Astronomical observatories in Turkey
National Observatory
Buildings and structures in Antalya Province
1991 establishments in Turkey
Robotic telescopes